Aceria is a genus of mites belonging to the family Eriophyidae, the gall mites. These tiny animals are parasites of plants. Several species can cause blistering and galls, including erineum galls. A few are economically significant pests, while others are useful as agents of biological pest control of invasive plants such as rush skeletonweed (Chondrilla juncea), creeping thistle (Cirsium arvense), and field bindweed (Convolvulus arvensis).

There are over 900 species in the genus.)

Selected species

 Aceria aloinis  – aloe mite
 Aceria anthocoptes  – rust mite, russet mite
 Aceria banatica 
 Aceria bipedis 
 Aceria calaceris  – western maple erineum mite
 Aceria calystegiae 
 Aceria campestricola 
 Aceria capreae 
 Aceria carmichaeliae 
 Aceria chondrillae  – skeletonweed gall mite, chondrilla gall mite
 Aceria clianthi 
 Aceria depressae 
 Aceria diospyri 
 Aceria elongata  – crimson erineum mite
 Aceria erinea 
 Aceria eriobotryae 
 Aceria ficus 
 Aceria fraxini  – ash bead gall mite
 Aceria fraxinicola 
 Aceria fraxinivora 
 Aceria gallae 
 Aceria genistae 
 Aceria gersoni 
 Aceria gleicheniae 
 Aceria guerreronis 
 Aceria hagleyensis 
 Aceria healyi 
 Aceria iteina 
 Aceria jasmini 
 Aceria jasminoidis 
 Aceria korelli 
 Aceria kuko 
 Aceria labiatiflorae  (syn. A. oregani)
 Aceria lanyuensis 
 Aceria litchii 
 Aceria litseae 
 Aceria lycopersici 
 Aceria malherbae  – bindweed gall mite
 Aceria mangiferae 
 Aceria manukae 
 Aceria mayae 
 Aceria melicopis 
 Aceria melicyti 
 Aceria microphyllae 
 Aceria mikaniae 
 Aceria monoica 
 Aceria nervisequa 
 Aceria parvensis 
 Aceria pimeliae 
 Aceria pipturi 
 Aceria plagianthi 
 Aceria pobuzii 
 Aceria pseudoplatani 
 Aceria roxburghianae 
 Aceria rubifaciens 
 Aceria sacchari 
 Aceria serratifoliae 
 Aceria sheldoni  – citrus bud mite
 Aceria shepherdiae 
 Aceria simonensis 
 Aceria spicati 
 Aceria strictae 
 Aceria sylvestrae 
 Aceria taiwanensis 
 Aceria tenuifolii 
 Aceria titirangiensis 
 Aceria tosichella 
 Aceria tulipae 
 Aceria victoriae 
 Aceria waltheri 
 Aceria virosae 
 Aceria yushania 
 Aceria zoysima

References

External links
 
 

Eriophyidae
Animals described in 1944
Taxa named by Hartford H Keifer
Trombidiformes genera